Manuel Perez (born 11 May 1991) is a French professional footballer who plays as a midfielder for Ligue 2 club Grenoble Foot 38.

Club career

Grenoble 
Perez made his professional debut with his hometown club of Grenoble in a Ligue 2 4–1 defeat against Reims in October 2010, coming in the pitch for the last ten minutes of the game. He stayed in Grenoble two more years, before joining Brest in 2013.

Lens 
On 11 June 2019, Perez signed a two-year contract with Ligue 2 club Lens.

Return to Grenoble 
On 5 October 2020, Perez returned to his former club Grenoble Foot 38. He signed a three-year contract.

Personal life
Perez is of Spanish descent through his grandparents, who are from Almería, Spain.

References

External links

Manuel Perez foot-national.com Profile

1991 births
Living people
Sportspeople from Grenoble
Association football midfielders
French footballers
French people of Spanish descent
Ligue 2 players
Ligue 1 players
Grenoble Foot 38 players
Stade Brestois 29 players
Clermont Foot players
RC Lens players
Footballers from Auvergne-Rhône-Alpes
21st-century French people